Fortuneleptura is a genus of beetles in the family Cerambycidae, containing the following species:

 Fortuneleptura cameneni Villiers, 1979
 Fortuneleptura romei Touroult, 2011

References

Lepturinae